Robert Willem van Werkhoven (born 29 January 1954 in Bloemendaal) is a sailor from the Netherlands, who represented his native country at the 1976 Summer Olympics in Kingston, Canada. With his brother Joop van Werkhoven as helmsman Van Werkhoven took the 13th place in the 470.

Sources
 
 
 
 
 
 
 

Living people
1954 births
People from Bloemendaal
Dutch male sailors (sport)

Sailors at the 1976 Summer Olympics – 470
Olympic sailors of the Netherlands
Sportspeople from North Holland